Inside Hitler's Bunker: The Last Days of the Third Reich is a book by historian Joachim Fest about the last days of the life of Adolf Hitler, in his Berlin Führerbunker in 1945.

The book was originally published in Germany in 2002. The English translation was released in 2004. The book formed source material for the 2004 German film Der Untergang (The Downfall) in 2004.

Publications
 Original German version: 
 First US version:

See also
List of Adolf Hitler books

Books about Adolf Hitler
History books about World War II
Books about Nazism
Non-fiction books adapted into films
Books by Joachim Fest
Works about the Battle of Berlin